Kleinnaundorf is a municipality subdivision of

 Tauscha (Saxony, Germany)
 Freital (Saxony, Germany)